The Wast Hills Observatory was established in 1982 mainly as a teaching laboratory, as a part of the Physics with Astrophysics BSc/MSci degree course at the University of Birmingham. It is situated in Kings Norton, Birmingham, England, 8 km away from the campus of the University. It has developed into a unique training and research facility for undergraduate and postgraduate students.

List of directors

References

External links 
 Wast Hills Observatory, University of Birmingham 

Astronomical observatories in England